Odra-Pisuerga is a comarca (county, but without administrative roles) located in the west of the province of Burgos, in the autonomous community of Castile and León, Spain. It is bounded by the west and south-west by the province of Palencia, south-east by the Arlanza comarca, west by the Alfoz de Burgos and north by the Páramos comarca.

Municipalities
Arenillas de Riopisuerga
Balbases, Los
Barrio de Muñó
Belbimbre
Castellanos de Castro
Castrillo de Riopisuerga
Castrillo Mota de Judíos
Castrojeriz
Grijalba
Hontanas
Iglesias
Itero del Castillo
Manciles
Melgar de Fernamental
Padilla de Abajo
Padilla de Arriba
Palacios de Riopisuerga
Palazuelos de Muñó
Pampliega
Pedrosa del Páramo
Pedrosa del Príncipe
Rebolledo de la Torre
Revilla Vallejera
Rezmondo
Sasamón
Sordillos
Sotresgudo
Susinos del Páramo
Tamarón
Tobar
Vallejera
Valles de Palenzuela
Villadiego
Villaldemiro
Villamayor de Treviño

Geography
The comarca is bounded in the west by the Pisuerga river, and in the east by its affluent, the Odra and Pisuerga river, giving name to the region.

History

See also

 Province of Burgos

Notes

External links
 website of the coordinadora Odra-Pisuerga 
 website of the Province of Burgos delegation

Comarcas of the Province of Burgos